Bangladeshi English literature (BEL) refers to the body of literary work written in the English language in Bangladesh and the Bangladeshi diaspora. The historical background of interpolation of English in this region dates back to the British colonial period. English touched the land through the historical process—the historical process of British colonization over the land. However, the thought of creative writing in the colonizer's language inflames the idea that it is a deliberate choice by the native people who exploit—to emphasize more—the language in a way which exceeds the possibility of language to be used only as a communicative medium. Here the first question comes to the issue of taking up English as a medium of creative writing, in which Bankim and Michael Madhusudan underwent a deliberate trial to emerge as writers. The process of writing in English is ever-expanding and now uses a new term, "Bengali English Literature", rather than "Bangaladeshi English Literature". In academia, it is also now referred to as Bangladeshi Writing in English (BWE). Early prominent Bengali writers in English included Ram Muhan Roy, Sake Dean Mahomed, Bankim Chandra Chatterjee, Begum Rokeya and Rabindranath Tagore. In 1905, Begum Rokeya (1880–1932) wrote Sultana's Dream, one of the world's earliest examples of feminist science fiction.  Modern writers of the Bangladeshi diaspora include Tahmima Anam, Neamat Imam, Monica Ali and Zia Haider Rahman.

Thus, literary study begins from the British colonial period in the Indian subcontinent, transcends to a specified land of Bangladesh after 1947 and is now diversified over the writings in English even by the Bangladeshi Diaspora who posses a content in English but context in Bangladesh.

Writers and their contributions (1774–2022)

Emergence of English in the Bangla Region (1774–1855)

Minute of Macaulay: the legal document of the establishment of English (1835) 
The Minute of Macaulay (Minute on Indian Education) paves the way for the establishment of English as a formal medium of transferring European philosophy and English literature down, valuing the momentum of Sanskrit and Arabic or Persian. The Minute, drafted and presented by Thomas Babington Macaulay in 1835, was an eventful historical milestone as it proposed the pressing need for English on the then Indian subcontinent. T. B. Macaulay, a great scholar of English literature and philosophy, was invited back to India in 1834 by the Lord Bentinck so that Macauley could serve as the law member of the Company. He was made the chief of the Public Instruction Committee to study the fate of Oriental education based on the Charter Act of 1813. Macaulay took this as an opportunity to attack Oriental literature written in Sanskrit, Arabic and Persian as he commented "a single shelf of a good European library was worth the whole native literature of India and Arabia". This remark by Macaulay inserted in the Minute disregarded the Oriental educational tools, techniques and total system, though it was grounded on the specific reasons that Macaulay explained in his Minutes. He was a liberal educationist who regarded education unbiased from religious sentiments which Macaulay found to have engulfed the Indian education nurtured through Sanskrit, Arabic or Persian. Macaulay had a firm conviction that Anglo-Saxon England transformed into the present enlightened England due to their embrace of Greek and Roman which bathed England in the philosophy and science documented in these languages. Macaulay had the conviction on the proposal that he made was in no way flawed and disrespectful to Indian education: "At that time almost everything that was worth reading was contained in the writings of the ancient Greeks and Romans. Had our ancestors acted as the Committee of Public Instruction has hitherto noted, had they neglected the language of Thucydides and Plato, and the language of Cicero and Tacitus, had they confined their attention to the old dialects of our own island, had they printed nothing and taught nothing at the universities but chronicles in Anglo-Saxon and romances in Norman French, – would England ever have been what she now is?" Perhaps; England would not have come to this point of pragmatic excellence if they had acted reverse on the account of nationalism. In the case of India and England, Macaulay hints at that stage of England, must not be the same as India is endowed with a rich spiritual culture and various religious sects had their respective momentum already established prior to the intrusion of the East India Company. However, English as a medium of teaching-learning became necessitated in order to endow the natives with utilitarianism philosophy. Macaulay proposes the natives know Milton, John Locke and Newton. Then, English emerges as the redeemer language as Macaulay admits he does not have the capability to preach through Sanskrit, Arabic and Persian. Moreover, Macaulay hints at producing a group of native nobles who will make close ties between the company and the natives and secondly take the role of preaching to their brothers. The historical truth is that Macaulay then succeeded with his Minute to persuade Lord Bentinck on the answer to the question of what the language of Indian educational instruction must be. In the 1835 "Resolution", Lord Bentinck stated, "I give my entire concurrence to the sentiments expressed in this minute" and passed English as the medium of teaching science and philosophy on the Indian subcontinent on March 7, 1835. English thus became established as one of the first graded languages having legal provisions. The bottom line is that Macaulay was the visionary behind the inception of English as a legal and superior language keeping Sanskrit, Arabic and Persian behind, and Lord Bentinck was the activist who materialized the vision; the natives were thus legally forced to learn English as a viable medium for learning western philosophy, science and literature.

The Hindu College at Kolkata (1817–1855) 

The Hindu College is the first considered institution that institutionalized English on the Indian subcontinent. The aim of this institution was to impart liberal education to the Hindus. The visionary Raja Ram Muhan Roy, the Hindu gentry, and the British government had the consent to establish this institution viewing the identical motive for preaching liberal art, European philosophy and literature. This institution began operation in 1817 and replaced Hindu mythology and metaphysics. The motif of the institution culminated in its success when Derozio joined in the Hindu College in 1828. His magical influence over the young Indian learners moved them to establish the Young Bengal liberal society, which broke the barrier of religious orthodoxy with the light of humanism and logic. A note in 1831 from the governing body reads that the learners have acquired competence in English and their knowledge in science is equal to the knowledge of any European learner of the sciences.

Rachana Chakravarty has pointed out:

When in 1847, the Professorships of Engineering and Experimental and Natural Philosophy were created on the condition that such lectures would be open to all students irrespective of caste or religion, the Hindu College succeeded in shedding its sectarian limitations.

Again, the British government tended to revise the name of this college in view of establishing this institution as a secular entity. The name changed to The Presidency College on 15 April 1855 and the Hindu College ended its history, merging into the new identity.

Raja Ram Mohan Roy (1774–1833)   
 
Raja Ram Mohan Roy (1774–1833) is the renaissance icon of Bangla literature. He is more remembered for his social reforms. Yet, he was a man who made an invaluable contribution to the establishment of English not only as a valuable medium of education but also as the first moral essayist of Bengali English literature.

The Hindu College has garnered due evaluation for its contributing influence in catering for English as a valued medium of instruction. Here, the name Ram Mohan Roy must claim the position of having motivated the British Raj to establish this college, as Chakraborty states:

This compelled the courier Ram Mohan Roy to aid the native gentry as well as the government to establish a formal institution for exercising secular ideologies, which are far distant from Indian metaphysics and mythology.  

Again, the contribution stated previously transcends Ram Mohan to the sphere of social reformation. And, his contribution to reach the ceiling of modernity in Bangla literature through the inception of the renaissance is also amplified. In contrast, his name has been little mentioned regarding English literature written by Bengalis; Bangladeshi history writers have tersely alluded to his name as if it were taboo to create an accolade of a few sentences for him. Askari has felt expiated only to refer Williams with his remarks for that personnel: "Raja Ram Mohan Roy, the father of the Bengali Renaissance, was also the 'father of Indian literature in English'".
The one sentence statement by Askari notes the exemplary impact over English literature in the Bongo Region as it states:
"He was the pioneer of a literary trend that has extended over a vast area of the subcontinent, including Bangladesh".
While in Rangpur, Ram Mohan took a lively interest in the political development in England and Europe. He used to read avidly all the journals and newspapers that Digby got from England, and thereby not only improved his knowledge of English which he had started to learn at the age of twenty-two, but also acquired considerable knowledge of European political thought. Through Digby it is evident that Ram Mohan was attracted by the political liberalism prevailing in Europe at that time.

Ghose has made a thorough discussion on the English work of Ram Mohan Roy. The following lists sketch the man's effort to social and political reformations from the perspectives of liberalism.

Thus, the emergence of Ram Muhan Roy, the establishment of the Hindu College and the Minutes of Macaulay helped the emergence of English in the Bengal region, which afforded those in the Bangla region the opportunity to create literature through English.

Period of early singing birds (1830–1870)

Light of reason (1870–1905)

Emergence of Muslim consciousness (1905–1947)

Pre-liberation period (1947–1971)

Post-liberation sensibility (1971–1980)

Transnational experimentation (1980–2000)

Contemporary scene (2000–2022)
A Golden Age by Tahmima Anam is set during the Bangladesh Liberation War in 1971. Anam is also the author of The Good Muslim. Zia Haider Rahman, a British Bangladeshi novelist, published his debut novel In the Light of What We Know in 2014, which won the James Tait Black Prize for literature in 2015. Rahman received glowing praise and acclaim for his first book, which The New Yorker described as "astonishingly achieved". Monica Ali's Brick Lane was shortlisted for the Booker Prize in 2003. Published from the US in 2018, Fayeza Hasanat's debut short story collection The Bird Catcher and Other Stories addresses gender expectations, familial love, and questions of identity and belonging. Like A Diamond in the Sky by Shazia Omar portrays the psychedelic world of Dhaka's university students, who are caught up in the haze of drugs, punk rock and fusion. Rashid Askari "has demonstrated enough artistic talent to come up with fiction in English". His short story collection Nineteen Seventy One and Other Stories (2011) has been translated into French and Hindi. In 2019, Mehrab Masayeed Habib wrote a novel named Slice of Paradise. It is an English novel based on Dhaka in the 1960s and published by Swore O Publication. It is now viable for contemporary Bangladeshi English writers to write about the details of transnationalism, the Liberation War, political disharmony, massive unplanned urbanization and identity issues.

Native Bangladeshi contributions

Fakrul Alam 
 
Fakrul Alam (born 20 July 1951) is an academician, writer, and translator. He writes on literary and postcolonial issues and has translated works of Jibanananda Das and Rabindranath Tagore into English. He has also translated Sheikh Mujibur Rahman's autobiographical works Asamapta Atmajibani (The Unfinished Memoirs) and Karagarer Rojnamcha (Prison Diaries), and Mir Mossaraf Hossain's epic novel Bishad- Sindhu (Ocean of Sorrow). He is a recipient of the Bangla Literary Award in translation and SAARC Literary Award.

Notable works include:

 Jibanananda Das: Selected Poems with an Introduction, Chronology, and Glossary
 Ocean of Sorrow
 Essential Tagore
 The Unfinished Memoirs
 Prison Diaries

Syed Manzoorul Islam 
 In the arena of English literary output, The Merman's Prayer and Other Stories eternalizes Syed Manzoorul Islam: the narrative of the stories are entangled between reality and fantasy. Twists and turns prevail in their narration. All the characters emerge from the fringes of Bangladeshi societies and the urban middle class. Desires and deprivations, ecstasies and frustrations engulf all the characters presented.

Kaiser Hamidul Haq 
Kaiser Haq is the most prominent name in Bangladeshi English-language poetry. He has contributed to the fields of poetry, translation of the poems of Shamsur Rahman, the leading poet of Bangladesh, and also prose translation. His works include:

Niaz Zaman 
Niaz Zaman is a writer, translator and an academician. She was honored with the Bangla Academy Literary Award in 2016 for her contribution to translation. Trees without Roots is a trans-created novel by Zaman grounded on Syed Waliullah’s novel Laal Shalu. Trees without Roots depicts typical natural scenery of Bangladesh like the ravages of nature, floods, and storms alongside the use of religion for food and shelter by the people like Majeed in society. This English novel brings the Bengali mind to the English-speaking world and the impact of religion as well as superstition on the village populace of Bengal.

Sabiha Haq 
Sabiha Haq (born January 1, 1977) has garnered a reputation for postcolonial and gender issues, women's writings, and cultural studies. The Mughal Aviary is the touchstone contribution in BEL (Bangladeshi English Literature) that categorically highlights the literary contributions of four Muslim women in the Mughal regime in pre-modern India: Gulbadan, Jahanara, Zeb-un-Nessa, and Habba Khatoon, the Nightingale of Kashmir. Their literary sensibilities were exposed with deep concern by the author who could never fail to highlight how gender politics made a mark on their lives and activities which were sufficient to efface their literary faculties. This book covers roughly 200 years of the 16th and 17th centuries that reflect the subjective tone and the self-fashioning of the princess under the Mughal regime through the forms of biography, hagiography and poetry by the four Zenana writers. Their writings depict a strong place for those women who could create a counter culture within the imposed culture they grew up in. The book The Mughal Aviary shows the dignity of the Muslim women as undiscovered writers and how the annals of history failed to pay due respect to their contributions.

Theme 
The book cherishes the contribution of the three Mughal princess: Gulbadan Begam (1523–1603), the youngest daughter of the Mughal Emperor Babur, Jahanara (1614–1681), the eldest daughter of the Emperor Shah Jahan, and Zeb-un-Nissa (1638–1702), the eldest daughter of the last Mughal Emperor Aurangzeb. The book also highlights the nightingale of Kashmir, Habba Khatoon (1554–1609). This book makes a thorough discussion and critical evaluation of Humayun-Nama (a biography on the emperor Humayun, the half-brother to Gulbadan Begam) by Gulbadan Begam, where the biographer delves into the lives of the wife and daughters of the Mughal Emperor, Babur. The hagiography by Jahanara tends to glorify the Mughal monarchy. The third writer excels in poetry where the subaltern spirit peeps up with magical gaiety. Habba is famed for her lyricism in Kashmiri poetry. Her pangs of separation add an elegiac tone to the regional poetry. Thus, the author, Sabiha Haq, excavates the prominence of Muslim women's writings even in pre-modern India, while history supposes to deliberately suppress the contributions of those living at the subaltern periphery.

Chapter details 

The Mughal Aviary has six chapters, as follows:
 "The Mughal Aviary and Women In/Out"
 "Humayun's Biographer Gulbadan Begam: A Quiet Observer of the Aviary"
 "Jahanara's Hagiographies: The Mind of A Matriarch"
 "Dissenting Songbird in the Aviary: The Poetry of Zeb-un-Nissa"
 "The Plaintive Songbird beyond the Aviary: Habba Khatoon's Lol"
 "Where to Conclude?"
Chapter one exposes the thought on the key metaphor, the aviary, distinctively featured with the harem or zenana established by the Mughals alongside their other khash mahals (special chambers). This chapter seeks to explore the unsought stories from the women, especially the sojourners of the "aviary" like the princess of the Mughal emperors. The scope of the "aviary" extends to the Queen of Kashmir who is linked among the other Mughal Sahajadies as Kashmir was annexed by the Mughal emperors and Habba Khatoon was the last queen of the Free Kashmir. Thus, the first chapter covers the literary women who had to peep up their heads with the literary spree during the Mughal period while the harem existed.

The second chapter deals with Gulbadan as a biographer. Gulbadan positions Humayun from the neutral point of view being a man of flesh and blood as well as of a strong sense of justice. Haq judges Gulbadan for making keen observations regarding Humayun's characteristics.

The third chapter delves into the hagiography of Jahanara Begam, where the biography is given a "self-fashioning", according to the author. Jahanara writes a biography on Sufi masters like Hadrat Sheikh Nizamuddin Auliya in Munis-ul-Arwah, and Mullah Shah Badakhshi in Risala-i-Sahibiya. She focuses on the spiritual power – soft power per se – of those Sufis that led to the spread of the Mughal dynasty. The Mughal Aviary traces the masculine flavor imposed on the translation of Jahanara's biography.

Chapter four points out the double marginalization of Zeb-un-Nissa. She is firstly a political victim and secondly the victim of subaltern marginalization; her poetry was not given a place in the annals of literary history in Mughal India.

Chapter five projects the plaintive notes of Habba Khatoon through her elegiac tone and lol. Habba had to embrace widowhood and loneliness due to Mughal state terrorism; the author sheds light on her poetry with the same effort as for the harem shahzadis.

The last chapter is developed with the author's argument that the course of the feminism and its history in the South Asian region needs to be redefined as to evaluate the literary contributions made by these four Muslim women under the patriarchal design of history.

Her "A Liminal Bengali Identity: Film Culture in Bangladesh" in Media Culture in Transnational Asia: Convergences and Divergences published by Rutgers University Press in 2020, transcends her proneness to cultural studies apart from the much-coveted area of the feminine-literary cosmos that is evident throughout her research work as well as her entries on Tahmima Anam, Selina Hossain, and Jahanara Imam in the Literary Encyclopedia.

Rashid Askari 
Rashid Askari (born 1 June 1965) is a prolific writer in Bangladesh writing both in Bangla and English. His English short story collection Nineteen Seventy One and Other Stories (2011) claims the secured place in the English literary arena of Bangladesh. The author is firmly committed to the 1971 Liberation War spirit through this book. The indomitable nationalism touches upon every aspect of the characters. The author shows his deeply rooted belongingness to the land, the culture and the heritage of Bangladesh. 

Askari sings the saga of mortified bravery of the women who may be prostitutes by profession, but pure in heart. Hence, Bashanti never craves for life in the sight of the hounds. Rather, she transcends herself through sacrifice. The story "The Maiden Whore" consoles:Bashanti was sinking headlong into the deep waters like a harpoon-hit mermaid. She knew she was nearing the end of her life. But she felt happy to think that she was still virgin. She had not been defiled by the alien beasts!

Meherab Habib 
Meherab Habib is born and brought up in Dhaka and published his debut novel, Slice of Paradise, in 2019. He takes writing as a passion and engineering as a profession.

The contemporary Bangladeshi English writers who represent the young generations are either English-medium students living in Bangladesh or diaspora generations who are living abroad and feel the urge to express. These specified characteristic writers have a few things in common in that the Liberation War, political ups and downs, transnational experience, fundamentalism and massive urbanization serve as the background for their writings. The writings of Tahamina Anam, Monica Ali, etc. are rooted in the theme of the Liberation War of Bangladesh and transnational identity searching with the backdrop of multi-nationality. Selim, Anarkoli, Arman and Labonee experience transnational identity and the search for the best place to settle all through the novels. Threading through the novel is a grand family drama that enables all the characters to feel a need for communion with the family. Labonee could not continue her strike activities as she feels weak in mind; Anowar leaves the battlefield and joined their family in Salt Lake, Calcutta, upon the suspicion of being caught by the military. It seems "heart is where home is" to almost all the characters of this novel. Kabir feels free upon his arrival in Dhaka from West Pakistan as he reiterates:

The incidents of history beginning in 1941 and culminating in June 1972 have created the characters and scenes of this novel. Yet, the glory of Dhaka city, its culture, eating habits, greenery, and walking fields surpass every crisis in the novel. All have become representatives of the capitalistic society where they feel comfortable and their success in attaining that capital. It seems the novel evolves to address it:

Contribution of the Bangladeshi Diaspora

Monica Ali 

Monica Ali's debut novel Brick Lane was published in 2003 and shortlisted for the Man Booker Prize that very year. This contribution acquires a shared space in the Bangladeshi English literary sphere, being a massive wake-up call from the Bangladeshi Diaspora. Ali was born in 1967 in Bangladesh and immigrated to England in 1971; all her growth, study, and settlement occurred in England. From this perspective, the characterizations and the evolving theme around the characters in the Brick Lane can never be addressed as her personal experiences; rather, these are her researched work on the plight of immigrants through generations and their nature of integration as well as disintegration with the host cultures.

Nazneen is brought to England by Chanu through settled marriage. Chanu is a middle-aged man searching for his fate in England; Nazneen is an adolescent representing the subservient, docile, submissive wife who is a perfect choice for Chanu as he believes women must have wifely and motherly behavior in the British perspective. Nazneen follows the code validated by Chanu, gives birth to a son and two daughters, and satisfies Chanu, being only a wife in mind.

The change of currents takes place as Nazneen feels a sense of beloningness in British society along with her two daughters in the absence of Chanu's knowledge on what is going on in the psyche of his wife. Chanu fails to cope with British society and expresses his wish to retreat to Bangladesh, which is met with direct protest from his wife and daughters. Nazneen can think out of the shell of the conch; she feels herself liberated, self-dominated‚ self-directed even upon the loss of the marital tie. Chanu here represents the first-generation Bangladeshi immigrant who feels guilt for the loss of his parental root in Bangladesh and longs for that past, though Nazneen, along with her daughters, belongs to the generations nonaligned with that of Chanu. Here lies the prime crisis all through the novel Brick Lane.

Tahmima Anam 
Tahmima Anam was born in Bangladesh in 1975 and brought up abroad. Now she is settled in England. She is well-known among Bangladeshi readers for her trilogy: A Golden Age (2007), The Good Muslim (2011) and The Bones of Grace (2016). This trilogy attempts to sketch out the family and socio-political ups and downs during the factional periods around the Liberation War, the rise of Muslim militancy and the reign of dictatorship in Bangladesh ranging from 1971 to the 1990s. The Golden Age (2007) was awarded the Commonwealth Prize for the first book category in 2008.

In an interview with The Guardian, Anam tells of her purposeful intentions to write the trilogy on the background of Bangladeshi society entangled with family bonding, religious inclination, and political upheavals. Anam says:

Anam has been credited with two other books, The Startup Wife (2021), and The Face: Third World Blues (2021). The Golden Age (2007) and The Good Muslim (2011) are developed in the context of Bangladesh. Instead, The Bones of Grace (2016), The Startup Wife (2021), and The Face: Third World Blues (2021) reiterate the experiences of an immigrant, the search for identity, and an unattainable experience of escapism. The protagonists are in the labyrinths whether they lose their parental connections, whether they are guilty of it, whether they should search for them, or whether they should keep abreast with the changing trends of the context.

Tariq Omar Ali 

Tariq Omar Ali has taught at Princeton University as Assistant Professor of History and now serves as Associate Professor at Georgetown University, USA. His teaching and writings focus on nineteenth- and twentieth-century South Asia and global histories of capital. His writing is research-oriented and focuses on the everyday lives of ordinary men and women, which are shaped by transnational circulations of commodities and capital. His first research book, the non-fiction A Local History of Global Capital: Jute and Peasant Life in the Bengal Delta, explores how global capitalism shaped peasant life and society in the Bengal Delta during the late nineteenth and early twentieth century. The writer has also continued this exploration of how "decolonization, independence, and the rise of the nation-state restructured the working lives of peasants, boatmen, itinerant traders, and small businessmen in post-colonial East Pakistan (present-day Bangladesh) in the 1950s and 1960s".

Tariq Omar Ali's A Local History of Global Capital: Jute and Peasant Life in the Bengal Delta (Princeton University Press, 2018) is a lucidly documented non-fiction wrought on the implication of the entire economic process of jute that enabled the Bengal Delta to make a significant mark in socio-political, cultural and regional development beginning from the British regime, and culminating with the dawn of the Pakistani period.

Omar has made the effort to consider the economic history, the golden economic history, of the then eastern region of the British Indian subcontinent, and the author would likely show the effort of infrastructure development, the urbanization process and the development of the Muslim consciousness. This consciousness gave the land influence in regional politics; thus a sense of nationalism grew in the public and the ultimate destiny of this consciousness brought the public to be the owner of a sovereign land, Bangladesh.

The back cover description of the non-fiction work reads:

Neamat Imam 
Neamat Imam is a Bangladeshi-Canadian fiction writer (born January 5, 1971) whose name was popularized with the debut novel The Black Coat, a novel that uses a Bangladeshi political setting around 1974 when the Mujib government experienced a famine. Black Coat is a metaphor that represents the father of the Bengali nation, Sheikh Mujibur Rahman. The novel proceeds through analytical narratives of his political diction and philosophy and creates a dystopian arena run by the philosophy of totalitarianism. Khaleque Biswas, Nur Hossain and Moina Mia are the major characters in the novel; the story continues with narration from Khaleque Biswas, who, after fired from a job in journalism, joins the propaganda work for Mujib, the possessor of the 'Black Coat'.

Zia Haider Rahman 
Main Article: Zia Haider Rahman

Rahman's debut novel is the 2014 In the Light of What We Know.

Media and journals
Bangladesh has an influential English-language press, including newspapers The Daily Star, New Age, Dhaka Tribune, The Muslim Times, and The Independent, which bring out regular literary supplements. Prominent magazines include The Star, Slate, Dhaka Courier and Forum. Bengal Lights is one of the country's few English literary journals.

See also
 Bangladeshi English
 Hay Festival Dhaka

References

Bangladeshi literature
Bangladeshi diaspora in the United Kingdom